Chiles is a surname, a variation of Childs, from the Anglo-Saxon 'Cild'. Notable people with the surname include:

 Adrian Chiles (born 1967), British TV and radio presenter
 Eddie Chiles (1910–1993), American businessman
 Henry G. Chiles Jr. (born 1938), United States Navy admiral
 James Chiles (died 1873), Confederate outlaw who rode with William Quantrill's gang
 John Chiles (born 1988), American football player
 Jordan Chiles, American gymnast
 Joseph Chiles, (1810–1885), California pioneer and guide, colonel in the U.S. Army
 Lawton Chiles (1930–1998), American politician
 Linden Chiles (1933–2013), American actor
 Lois Chiles (born 1947), American actress and model
 Marcellus H. Chiles (1895–1918), American soldier, World War I Medal of Honor recipient
 Pearce Chiles (1899–?), American baseball player
 Rich Chiles (born 1949), American baseball player
 Walter Chiles (died 1653), Virginia colonial politician

Fictional characters:

 Jackie Chiles, fictional attorney on the American television series Seinfeld